Tetramelas confusus is a species of crustose lichen in the family Caliciaceae. Found in the South Island of New Zealand, it was formally described as a new species in 2002 by Anders Nordin. The lichen is only known to occur in the Central Otago mountains, where it grows in alpine grasslands on dead grass, plant detritus, and old rabbit droppings. It has a thin, creamy-white to greyish-white thallus that spreads irregularly. Its ascospores are ellipsoid in shape, thin-walled with a single septum, and measure 13–25 by 5–7·5 μm. Secondary chemicals found in the lichen include 6-O-methylarthothelin (major) and atranorin (minor). Similar species include T. papillatus, T. insignis, and T. graminicolus.

References

Caliciales
Lichen species
Lichens described in 2004
Lichens of New Zealand